Christy O'Connor may refer to two Irish golfers:
Christy O'Connor Snr (1924–2016)
Christy O'Connor Jnr (1948–2016), his nephew